GT Racing 2: The Real Car Experience is a racing video game developed by Gameloft Bulgaria and published by Gameloft. It is the sequel to GT Racing: Motor Academy.

Gameplay
GT Racing 2: The Real Car Experience is a racing game similar to the series Real Racing, especially Real Racing 3 and the second installment in the Gameloft racing series as a continuation of GT Racing: Motor Academy. It provides 67 licensed cars from more than 30 manufacturers and 13 tracks. Single player mode includes real controller ghosts similar to RR3. The single player mode is divided into 7 levels. Just like in RR3, you need special cars to finish specific levels. You can upgrade your car, and needs real-time and mechanical time, but it doesn't take time or cost to repair cars unlike RR3.

In multiplayer you can compete against other players from all over the world and create teams. There are more than 1,400 events in total with modes such as classic races, duels, knockout and overtaking. New challenges are added weekly. There are different weather conditions, driving aids and customization options.

Some of the tracks included are:

- Heimstrecke (Germany)

- Lake Como (Italy)

- Glen Canyon Dam (United States)

- Montreal (Canada)

- Cote d'Azur (France)

- Sunrise Ruins (United States)

Vehicles

Compact Showdown
 Alfa Romeo MiTo
 Chevrolet Sonic
 Renault Clio
 Audi A3 1.8 TFSI quattro S Line
 Volkswagen Polo Mark V
 Fiat 500
 Volkswagen Golf A6
 Toyota FT-86 II (Removed)

Factory Championship
 Mini Cooper Coupe
 Renault Clio IV RS
 Renault Laguna Coupe
 Dodge Dart GT
 Volkswagen Scirocco
 Citroen DS3 Racing
 BMW 128 Coupe

Street Sport Series
 Opel Astra OPC
 Volkswagen CC
 Renault Megane RS
 Mitsubishi Lancer Evolution X
 Ford Focus RS
 Subaru Impreza WRX STI
 Audi RS 5 Coupe
 Audi TT RS Coupe
 Lexus GS (Removed)
 Chevrolet Code 130R
 BMW M235i
 Nissan 370Z

Exotic Sport Clash
 Pontiac G8 GXP
 Mitsubishi Lancer Evolution X GSR
 Toyota Supra GT (Removed)
 Tesla Model S (Removed)
 Citroen Survolt
 BMW M3
 Mercedes-Benz A 45 AMG
 Seat Leon WTCC (Removed)
 Mercedes-Benz SLK 55 AMG
 Chevrolet Camaro
 Ford Mustang
 Chevrolet Corvette
 Aston Martin Vanquish
 Cadillac CTS-V
 RUF RK Coupe

Track Performance Club
 Nissan GT-R (R35)
 Mercedes-Benz SLS AMG
 RUF RT 12
 SRT Viper
 Maserati MC12
 Chevrolet Camaro GT Race Car
 Cadillac CTS-VR Coupe Race Car
 Ferrari 599 GTO
 Renault Megane Trophy
 McLaren MP4-12C
 Lotus Evora GTE
 Ford GT
 Renault Alpine ZAR (Removed)
 Mercedes-Benz CLK GTR AMG
 Ferrari 458 Italia
 Ferrari F12berlinetta

Race-Tuned Competition
 Audi R18
 Mazda Furai
 Bentley Speed 8
 Caterham SP 300R
 Lamborghini Sesto Elemento
 Ferrari 599XX
 Savage Rivale GTS
 Lamborghini Aventador LP 700-4
 Lamborghini Veneno
 Savage Rivale GTS Winter
 Volkswagen Golf 24
 Mercedes-Benz SLS AMG GT3
 W Motors Lykan HyperSport
 Bugatti Veyron

Legendary Club
 Nissan Datsun 260Z
 Dodge Charger
 Ford Mustang Boss 302
 Ford Shelby GT500
 Mercedes-Benz 300 SL Gullwing
 Plymouth Hemi Cuda
 Renault Alpine A110 (Removed)
 RUF CTR Yellowbird
 Maseati 300 S 1956
 Lamborghini Countach 25th Anniv.

Reception
Derek C. Tillotson of Gamezebo gave the game 4 out of 5 stars and stated, "Despite its lack of price tag, this one is well worth a shot for those open to a new racing experience, this one is well worth a shot. It has all the elements and polish that those titles do. Not original, but still fun." Jon Mundy of Pocket Gamer gave the game 4 out of 5 stars and stated, "GT Racing 2 is a slightly less dazzling with a marginally less obnoxious IAP system. It's a very good racing game, and a great showcase for newer Apple hardware."

References

2013 video games
Racing simulators
Racing video games
Gameloft games
Android (operating system) games
iOS games
Windows Phone games
Java platform games
Mobile games
Video games developed in Bulgaria